Nansi District, alternatively spelled Nanxi, is a rural district of about 8,951 residents in Tainan, Taiwan.

Name
Nansi was so named because it is west of the Cishan River (Qishan). The 'nan' in 'Nansi' is an abbreviation for Nanzixian River, an alternate name for Cishan River. The 'si' means 'west'. This name originated in the period of Taiwan under Japanese rule.

History

After the handover of Taiwan from Japan to the Republic of China in 1945, Nansi was organized as a rural township of Tainan County. On 25 December 2010, Tainan County was merged with Tainan City and Nansi was upgraded to a district of the city.

Geography
Nansi District borders Nanhua District to the east; Yujing District to the south; Dongshan District, Lioujia District, and Danei District to the west; and Dapu, Chiayi to the north.

Administrative divisions
The district consists of Nanxi, Wanqiu, Miqi, Zhaoxing, Lutian, Guidan and Tungshi Village.

Tourist attractions
 Lutaoyang Jiang Family Residence
 Plum Mountain

See also
 Tainan

References

External links

 

Districts of Tainan